Alapakkam is a neighbourhood in western part of Central Chennai. It belongs to Central Chennai Revenue Division of Chennai district. It is surrounded by Porur, Valasaravakkam and Maduravoyal. It is part of Chennai corporation under zone 11. Entry in to Alapakkam is through two main roads, that is, Arcot Road and Poonamallee High Road. Alapakkam belongs to Sriperumbudur Lok Sabha constituency and Maduravoyal assembly constituency.

Educational institutions
Educational institutions in the neighbourhood include:
 Government Higher secondary school 
 Chennai Corporation school 
 Velammal Vidyalaya School
 Sree Adithya Matriculation School
 Meenakshi Dental College
 Seven Hills Polytechnic
 Muthukumaran Engineering college
 Acharya Shiksha Mandir (Ashtalakshmi Nagar)
Devi Academy School

Temples 
Nataraja temple

Nataraja Temple is one of the most famous temple in this area. It is one of the two Nataraja temple in Chennai where Nataraja is worshiped as main deity. Here Maragatha Lingam poojai is daily done two times. People around this area call this temple as Chennaiyil Chidambaram or Chennaiyil Thillai.

Valliserapaleeshwarar Temple
Valliserapaleeshwarar Temple is a native temple of Alappakkam. One of the oldest temple in the region, this temple is related with Vali in Ramayanam. It is said that Vali got the secret powers from Lord Shiva by doing penance here. The deity here is called as Vali-sera-paleeshwarar, which over time changed to Valliserapaleeshwarar.

Neighbourhood 
Ashtalakshmi Nagar : Ashtalakshmi nagar has 4 Main roads which are 40 feet wide and 27 Streets which are 30 feet wide.

Public utilities 
 Tasildar Office & E-Seva Maiyam located in Alapakkam behind Perumal koil Street.

Post Office for Alapakkam is located at Sakthi Nagar, Porur (Off Mount Poonamallee Road).

 Corporation Office is  Zone located at Arcot Road.
Chennai Metro water and Sewerage Board area office is located at No.8A, Gangai Amman Koil Street, Alapakkam

References 

Neighbourhoods in Chennai